Pistillifera is a suborder of endopterygote insects within the Antliophora that contains the scorpionflies and hangingflies. It was described by R. Willmann in 1987.

References

Antliophora
Insect suborders